is a commercial and fine art Japanese photographer.

Bibliography
Alternates, New York:Rizzoli (1984)

References

External links
Official website 

Japanese photographers
1936 births
Living people
Fine art photographers